Geoffrey Hylton Jarrett (born 1 December 1937) is a retired Australian Roman Catholic bishop who served as bishop of the Roman Catholic Diocese of Lismore.

Formerly an Anglican priest, Jarrett converted to the Catholic Church in 1965. He was ordained a priest in Sydney on 14 May 1970 by the Archbishop of Hobart, Guilford Clyde Young.

Pope John Paul II appointed him coadjutor bishop of Lismore on 9 December 2000. His episcopal consecration was performed by the Archbishop of Sydney, Cardinal Edward Clancy, on 22 February 2001 at St Carthage's Cathedral, Lismore; his co-consecrators were Francesco Canalini, Apostolic Nuncio in Australia and John Satterthwaite, Bishop of Lismore. He chose Supra firmam petram as his motto.

After John Satterthwaite's resignation, he succeeded him on 1 December 2001 in the office of Bishop of Lismore and was introduced to the office on 12 December of the same year.

Pope Francis accepted his age-related resignation on 20 December 2016.

He was succeeded by Greg Homeming on 22 February 2017.

References

External links

1937 births
21st-century Roman Catholic bishops in Australia
Anglican priest converts to Roman Catholicism
Roman Catholic Diocese of Lismore
Living people
Roman Catholic bishops of Lismore